The 2016–17 Temple Owls women's basketball team will represent Temple University during the 2016–17 NCAA Division I women's basketball season. The season marks the third for the Owls as members of the American Athletic Conference. The Owls, led by eighth year head coach Tonya Cardoza, played their home games at McGonigle Hall and the Liacouras Center. They finished the season 24–8, 13–3 in AAC play to finish in second place. They advanced to the semifinals of the American Athletic Conference women's tournament where they lost to South Florida. They received at-large bid to the NCAA women's tournament, which was their first time since 2007, where they were upset by Oregon in the first round.

Media
All Owls home games will have video streaming on Owls TV, ESPN3, or AAC Digital. Road games will typically be streamed on the opponents website, though conference road games could also appear on ESPN3 or AAC Digital. There are no radio broadcasts for Owls women's basketball games.

Roster

Schedule and results

|-
! colspan="12" style="background:#9e1b34; color:#fff;"| Exhibition

|-
! colspan="12" style="background:#9e1b34; color:#fff;"| Regular season

|-
! colspan="12" style="background:#9e1b34; color:#fff;"| American Athletic Conference Women's Tournament

|-
! colspan="12" style="background:#9e1b34; color:#fff;"| NCAA Women's Tournament

Rankings

See also
 2016–17 Temple Owls men's basketball team

References

Temple Owls women's basketball seasons
Temple
Temple
Temple
Temple